Alex Guerci (born 31 July 1989) is an Italian professional footballer who plays as a midfielder for SSD Mapello.

Club career

A.C. Milan
Guerci got his first first-team call-up for a Champions League match against Anderlecht, on 17 October 2006 and managed to get a spot on the bench, due to Kaladze's last minute injury. He was on the bench also in a Coppa Italia game against Brescia and, due to the large number of injured players, in another Champions League match against AEK Athens.

He made his first-team debut as a second-half substitute for Leandro Grimi in a 2-3 loss at San Siro against Udinese on 19 May 2007.

Pergocrema
In June 2008 Guerci was transferred to Pergocrema in a co-ownership deal and was fully acquired the following season.

References

External links

Alex Guerci at Tuttocampo

1989 births
Living people
Italian footballers
Serie A players
Serie C players
Serie D players
A.C. Milan players
U.S. Pergolettese 1932 players
Calcio Lecco 1912 players
Virtus Bergamo Alzano Seriate 1909 players
U.S. Massese 1919 players
Sportspeople from the Province of Cremona
Association football midfielders
Footballers from Lombardy
A.C.D. Sant'Angelo 1907 players